Jean Babette Stein  (February 9, 1934 – April 30, 2017) was an American author and editor.

Early life
Stein was born to a Jewish family in Chicago. Her father was Jules C. Stein (1896–1981), co-founder of the Music Corporation of America (MCA) and the Jules Stein Eye Institute at University of California, Los Angeles.  Her mother, Doris J. Stein (1902–1984), established the Doris Jones Stein Foundation. Jean Stein's sister, Susan Shiva, died of breast cancer in 1983, as did Doris Stein.

Stein was educated at the Katharine Branson School in Ross, California, then at Brillantmont International School in Lausanne, Switzerland, after which she graduated from Miss Hewitt's Classes in New York City. Thereafter, she spent two years at Wellesley College and then attended classes at the University of Paris (formerly known as the Sorbonne). While in Paris she interviewed William Faulkner, with whom she had an affair, and, according to the historian Joel Williamson, offered the interview to The Paris Review in exchange for being made an editor there.

Career
Stein returned to New York and worked in 1955 as assistant to director Elia Kazan on the original production of Tennessee Williams's Pulitzer Prize winning play Cat on a Hot Tin Roof.

Stein was the author of three books and a pioneer of the narrative form of oral history. Her final work was a cultural and political history of Los Angeles, West of Eden, published by Random House in February 2016 where she included interviews with stars like Arthur Miller, [Gore Vidal], and Jacquelyn "Jackie" Park. In 1970, Stein authored, with George Plimpton as editor, a biography of Robert F. Kennedy, titled American Journey: The Times of Robert Kennedy.

With Plimpton, Stein co-wrote the best-selling book Edie: American Girl, based on the life of socialite/actress and Andy Warhol muse Edie Sedgwick, in 1982. Norman Mailer wrote of Edie: "This is the book of the Sixties that we have been waiting for."

Stein also worked as a magazine editor. In the late 1950s, she was an editor, with Plimpton, at The Paris Review. From 1990 to 2004, she was editor of the literary/visual arts magazine Grand Street with art editor Walter Hopps. The magazine actively sought out international authors, visual artists, composers and scientists to bring to its readership.

Legacy
In 2017, Stein partnered with PEN America to launch the PEN/Jean Stein Book Award and the PEN/Jean Stein Grant for Oral History to honor groundbreaking literature. The annual $75,000 PEN/Jean Stein Book Award, which is awarded to a book of fiction, memoir, essay, or nonfiction, “focuses global attention on remarkable books that propel experimentation, wit, strength, and the expression of wisdom.” Hisham Matar, a Libyan-American writer, won the 2017 inaugural award for his memoir, The Return. The $10,000 PEN/Jean Stein Grant for Oral History is awarded to support the completion of a “literary work of nonfiction that uses oral history to illuminate an event, individual, place, or movement.”

Personal life
Stein's first marriage in 1958 was to William vanden Heuvel, a lawyer who served in the U.S. Justice Department under Robert F. Kennedy, and who later also became a diplomat and author. Their first daughter, Katrina vanden Heuvel, was born in 1959; she was the editor and publisher of The Nation magazine. The couple's second daughter, Wendy vanden Heuvel, is an actress and producer in New York. She is also on the board of the 52nd Street Project, which matches inner-city youth with professional theater artists to create original dramatic works.

From 1995 to 2007, Stein was married to Torsten Wiesel, a co-recipient with David H. Hubel of the 1981 Nobel Prize in Physiology or Medicine.

Suffering from depression, Stein committed suicide by jumping from her Manhattan apartment on April 30, 2017. She was 83.

Selected bibliography

References

1934 births
2017 deaths
American magazine editors
Women magazine editors
American biographers
American people of Lithuanian-Jewish descent
Writers from Los Angeles
University of Paris alumni
Hewitt School alumni
Wellesley College alumni
Historians from New York (state)
Suicides by jumping in New York City
Stein family (MCA)